Crepidula cachimilla is a species of sea snail, a marine gastropod mollusk in the family Calyptraeidae, the slipper snails or slipper limpets, cup-and-saucer snails, and Chinese hat snails.

Distribution

Description
The maximum recorded shell length is 52.2 mm.

Habitat
Minimum recorded depth is 10 m. Maximum recorded depth is 20 m.

References

External links

Calyptraeidae
Molluscs of the Atlantic Ocean
Gastropods described in 2004